South Asia Theological Research Institute (SATHRI) was established by the Board of Theological Education of the Senate of Serampore College (BTESSC) in the year 1989.  It is located at Mack House Complex in Serampore.

It offers doctoral programmes in theology.

Background
In the eighties, the BTESSC and the Senate of Serampore College (University) saw the urgency to establish initially one advanced research centre in the country to:
 develop, 
 coordinate, and
 facilitate
research at doctoral and non-degree levels emphasizing its indigenous and contextual character.  Intense planning and negotiation led to the establishment of SATHRI in 1989 in Bangalore  as the research wing of the BTESSC to deal with the promotion of contextualized research, both at the degree and the non-degree levels.

It was meant to strengthen centres for research and to promote basic tools for theological education, to involve in publication of research work and to arrange for programmes that would strengthen the relationship between the theological institutions for the purpose of research.

Validation
 The Senate of Serampore College (University) was one of the first institutions in India to be given the status of a university in 1829.
 The Board of Theological Education of the Senate of Serampore College (BTESSC) established in 1975 is the theological arm under the Senate.
 SATHRI is the research wing under BTESSC established in 1989.

Courses offered
{| class="toccolours" style="float:right; margin-left:1em; font-size:85%; background:#ffc; color:black; width:35em; max-width:40%;" cellspacing="0" cellpadding="0"
|-
! style="background:#ccc;"| Succession of Deans of SATHRI
|-
| style="text-align: left;" |
1989-2000, The Rev. K. C. Abraham, Ph.D. (Princeton),
2000-2009,<ref>Minutes of the 35th Meeting of the Board of Theological Education of Senate of Serampore College held on 3rd and 4th February 2010 at the United Theological College, Bengaluru, Karnataka. - Report of the Director In-Charge, Research and SATHRI, p.6.</ref> The Rev. Samson Prabhakar, Dr. Theol. (Berne),
2009-2011, The Rev. A. Wati Longchar, D.Th. (Serampore),
2011-2014, The Rev. H. Vanlalauva, D.Th. (Serampore),
2014-2018, The Rev. P. G. George, Th.D. (Toronto)
2018-present, The Rev. Limatula Longkumer, D. Th. (Serampore)
|}

Doctor of Theology (Th.D.) in the fields of:
 Old Testament
 New Testament
 Theology and Ethics
 Women's Studies
 Dalit Theology
 Communication

Administration
A Dean oversees the programmes of SATHRI under the supervision of a Committee on Research of the Senate of Serampore College (University).

Journal
The SATHRI Journal'' is an occasional bulletin published by SATHRI.

References
Notes

Further reading
 
 

Seminaries and theological colleges in India
Colleges in Bangalore
Educational institutions established in 1989
Reformed church seminaries and theological colleges
Anglican seminaries and theological colleges
Christian seminaries and theological colleges in India
Seminaries and theological colleges affiliated to the Senate of Serampore College (University)
1989 establishments in West Bengal
India